The 1993 GP Ouest-France was the 57th edition of the GP Ouest-France cycle race and was held on 24 August 1993. The race started and finished in Plouay. The race was won by Thierry Claveyrolat of the Gan team.

General classification

References

1993
1993 in road cycling
1993 in French sport